In architecture, a boss is a knob or protrusion of wood, stone, or metal.

Description

Bosses can often be found in  the ceilings of buildings, particularly at the keystones at the intersections of a rib vault.   In Gothic architecture, such roof bosses (or ceiling bosses) are often intricately carved with foliage, heraldic devices or other decorations. Many feature animals, birds, or human figures or faces, sometimes realistic, but often Grotesque: the Green Man is a frequent subject.

The Romanesque Norwich Cathedral in Norfolk, England, has the largest number of painted carved stone bosses in the world; an extensive and varied collection of over one thousand individual pieces. Many of these decorated bosses still bear the original gilt and pigments from the time of their creation.

A different sense of boss was also an important feature of ancient and Classical construction.  When stone components were rough-cut offsite at quarries, they were usually left with bosses (small knobs) protruding on at least one side.  This allowed for easy transport of the pieces to the site; once there, the bosses also facilitated raising and/or inserting them into place.  An excellent extant example of such bosses can be seen at the Greek Doric temple of Segesta in western Sicily, at which construction was never completed.  The bosses of several key elements of the temple, notably the base platform or crepidoma, remain as a testament to the construction process.

Gallery

See also

 Bossage
 Three hares

References

Ornaments (architecture)